Calea harlingii is a species of flowering plant in the aster family, Asteraceae. It is endemic to Ecuador, where it is known only from one population discovered in Loja Province in 1980. It is a shrub or subshrub that grows in low-elevation forests in the Andes. It is threatened by habitat destruction.

References

harlingii
Endemic flora of Ecuador
Vulnerable plants
Taxonomy articles created by Polbot